The Welwyn Roman Baths are a Roman ruin preserved under the A1(M) just north of modern-day Welwyn Garden City, Hertfordshire, England. The baths were a small part of the Dicket Mead villa, which was originally built in the 3rd century AD.

The village of Welwyn has been described as being the site of a Romano-British settlement, where a Roman road crossed the river Mimram. There was another Roman villa near Welwyn on the Lockleys estate.

The full extent of the Dicket Mead villa was never fully excavated prior to the construction of the motorway, but the baths were only one of at least four buildings in total. The complex was probably part of a farm. It has been speculated that it might have been at least in part the equivalent of a hotel, lying as it does near Roman roads.

The ruins were uncovered in 1960 by local archaeologist Tony Rook, and the baths were gradually uncovered over the following 10 years by excavation. Shortly after the excavation was completed, the Ministry of Transport announced the route of a new motorway, straight over the top of the excavation.

Access
Eventually arrangements were made whereby a steel vault would be built over the top of the baths with an access tunnel for the public. Once the vault was completed the motorway was built over the top of it, and the remains of the baths sit 9 metres below junction 6. Only about half of the original extent of the baths is now on display. Visible parts remaining include the hypocaust, the tepidarium (warm room), caldarium (hot room) and the frigidarium (cold room) floor and cold bath, constructed from opus signinum.

Once the vault was finished, the bulk of the remaining parts of the Dicket Mead villa were covered over by the roadworks. Archaeological material from the site is stored at Mill Green Museum, part of Welwyn Hatfield Museum Service, which also operates the baths. This stored material can be inspected by contacting the curator.

Images

See also
 List of Roman public baths

References

External links
roman-baths – Official site at Mill Green Museum
Welwyn Roman Baths – Pastscape

Tourist attractions in Hertfordshire
History of Hertfordshire
Ancient Roman baths in England
Roman sites in Hertfordshire
Archaeological sites in Hertfordshire
Scheduled monuments in Hertfordshire
Museums in Hertfordshire
Museums of ancient Rome in the United Kingdom
Archaeological museums in England
3rd-century establishments in Roman Britain
Welwyn